In the 2018–19 season, Al Sadd SC is competing in the Qatar Stars League for the 46th season, as well as the Emir of Qatar Cup and the Champions League.

Pre-season and friendlies
It is decided that the first football team of the Al Sadd Club will leave for Austria to enter the camp on July 12 until the 28th of this month as part of preparations for the 2018–19 season. The team will play 3 friendly matches during the next period, during July 19 for the first friendly, July 23 for the second, and finally the third on July 27.

Competitions

Overview

{| class="wikitable" style="text-align: center"
|-
!rowspan=2|Competition
!colspan=8|Record
!rowspan=2|Started round
!rowspan=2|Final position / round
!rowspan=2|First match	
!rowspan=2|Last match
|-
!
!
!
!
!
!
!
!
|-
| Qatar Stars League

| Matchday 1
| style="background:gold;"| Winner
| 5 August 2018 
|  13 April 2019
|-
| Emir of Qatar Cup

| Quarter Final 
| style="background:silver;"| Runners–up
| 2 May 2019 
| 16 May 2019 
|-
| Champions League

| Quarter-final
| Semi-final
| 27 August 2018
| 23 October 2018
|-
| Champions League

| colspan=2| Group stage
| 5 March 2019
| 20 May 2019
|-
! Total

Qatar Stars League

League table

Results summary

Results by round

Matches

Emir of Qatar Cup

2018 AFC Champions League

Knockout stage

Quarter-finals

Semi-finals

2019 AFC Champions League

Group stage

Group D

Squad information

Playing statistics

|-

|-
! colspan=14 style=background:#dcdcdc; text-align:center| Players transferred out during the season

Goalscorers
Includes all competitive matches. The list is sorted alphabetically by surname when total goals are equal.

Players

}

Players with Multiple Nationalities
   Ibrahim Majid
   Pedro Miguel
   Yasser Abubakar
   Ali Asad
   Ahmed Sayyar
   Hussain Bahzad
   Ali Ferydoon
   Boualem Khoukhi

Transfers

In

Out

New Contracts

Notes

References

Al Sadd SC seasons
Qatari football clubs 2018–19 season